U4, U-4, or U04 may refer to:

Science and technology
 U4 spliceosomal RNA, a non-coding RNA component of the major U2-dependent spliceosome
 Haplogroup U4 (mtDNA), a human genetic group
 U4, unitary group of degree 4
 U-47700, a synthetic opioid
 U04, the ICD-10 code for severe acute respiratory syndrome

Transport
 U-Bahn lines
 U4 (Berlin U-Bahn)
 U4 (Frankfurt U-Bahn)
 U4 (Hamburg U-Bahn)
 U4 (Munich U-Bahn)
 U4 (Vienna U-Bahn)
 German submarine U-4, one of several German submarines
 London Buses route U4
 U-4, the U.S. Air Force version of the Aero Commander (aircraft), a light twin-engined aircraft from Aero Design and Engineering Company
 U-4, the Japanese air self-defense force designation for the Gulfstream IV aircraft
 U4, PMTair (former) IATA airline designator
 U4, Buddha Air current IATA airline designator

Organizations
 U4, the former name of the Maple League of Universities
 Anti-Corruption Resource Centre, based at the Chr. Michelsen Institute in Bergen, Norway

Other uses
 U4, an unemployment figure released by the United States Bureau of Labor Statistics
 Ultima IV: Quest of the Avatar, a video game

See also
4U (disambiguation)